Geoff Case (18 September 1935 – 22 June 2018) was an Australian rules footballer who played in the Victorian Football League (VFL).

Case was a tough midfielder and played his 122 VFL games for Melbourne, which included the 1955, 1957, 1959 and 1960 winning grand finals.  He also represented the VFL, but retired at the relatively young age of just twenty-six in 1962.

References

External links

1935 births
2018 deaths
Melbourne Football Club players
Australian rules footballers from Victoria (Australia)
People educated at Melbourne High School
Place of birth missing
Four-time VFL/AFL Premiership players
Melbourne Football Club Premiership players
People educated at Melbourne Grammar School